The Honda Jazz nameplate has been used by the Japanese manufacturer Honda to denote several different motorized vehicles since 1982:

 1982–1986 — The first generation Honda City when marketed in Europe, as Opel owned the City name
 1986–2001 — A 50 cc cruiser-style motorcycle (AC09)
 1993–1996 — Japanese-market name for a badge-engineered Isuzu MU (Isuzu Amigo)
 2001–present — In Europe, Oceania, the Middle East, Southeast Asia, India, and Africa the Honda Fit five-door hatchback automobile is sold as the Jazz
 2002–2009 — Canadian-market name used on the Honda CHF50 scooter

Jazz